Ernest Lee "Tex" Jeanes (December 19, 1900 – April 5, 1973) was a Major League Baseball outfielder who played for five seasons. He played for the Cleveland Indians (1921–1922), the Washington Senators (1925–1926), and the New York Giants in 1927. His uncle was Hall of Famer Tris Speaker.

In 53 major league games, Jeanes posted a .274 batting average (20-for-74) with 15 runs, a home run and 11 RBI. In 149 innings (148 innings in the outfield, 1 inning at pitcher), Jeanes handled 48 total chances (46 putouts, 2 assists) without an error for a perfect 1.000 fielding percentage.

External links

1900 births
1973 deaths
Cleveland Indians players
Washington Senators (1901–1960) players
New York Giants (NL) players
Major League Baseball outfielders
Baseball players from Texas
Trinity Tigers baseball players
Minor league baseball managers
Galveston Pirates players
Saginaw Aces players
Syracuse Stars (minor league baseball) players
Birmingham Barons players
Memphis Chickasaws players
Dallas Steers players
Fort Worth Cats players
Tulsa Oilers (baseball) players
Omaha Packers players
Longview Cannibals players
Longview Texans players
People from Ellis County, Texas
Coffeyville Refiners players